The Rose Cross (also called Rose Croix and Rosy Cross) is a symbol largely associated with the legendary Christian Rosenkreuz; Christian Kabbalist, alchemist, and founder of the Rosicrucian Order. The Rose Cross is a cross with a rose at its centre, often red, golden or white and symbolizes the teachings of a Western esoteric tradition with Christian tenets.

Symbolism

The Rosicrucian Manifestos were written during the Protestant Reformation in Germany, and have an underlying theme of reform. In 1520, Martin Luther had a seal made with a five-petaled white rose encapsulating a heart, with a simple cross in the centre. Johannes Valentinus Andreae, a likely candidate for the authorship of the third Rosicrucian manifesto, the Chymical Wedding of Christian Rosenkreutz, came from a family whose crest featured an X-shaped cross with roses in the four corners.

Many allegorical and esoteric explanations for the Rose Cross have arisen over the centuries. Some groups, such as the Ancient and Mystical Order Rosae Crucis, purport that the rosy cross predates Christianity, where "the cross represents the human body and the rose represents the individual's unfolding consciousness.

It has also been suggested that the rose represents silence while the cross signifies "salvation, to which the Society of the Rose-Cross devoted itself by teaching mankind the love of God and the beauty of brotherhood, with all that they implied." Others saw the Rosy Cross as a symbol of the human process of reproduction elevated to the spiritual: "The fundamental symbols of the Rosicrucians were the rose and the cross; the rose female and the cross male, both universal phallic [...] As generation is the key to material existence, it is natural that the Rosicrucians should adopt as its characteristic symbols those exemplifying the reproductive processes. As regeneration is the key to spiritual existence, they therefore founded their symbolism upon the rose and the cross, which typify the redemption of man through the union of his lower temporal nature with his higher eternal nature."

It is further a symbol of the Philosopher's stone, the ultimate product of the alchemist.

Rosicrucianism

The Rosicrucian manifestos tell an allegorical story of the Rosicrucian Brotherhood, founded in the early 14th century, or between the 13th and 14th centuries, as an Invisible College of mystic sages, by a sage having the symbolic name of Christian Rosenkreuz in order "to prepare a new phase of the Christian religion to be used during the coming age now at hand, for as the world and man evolve so also must religion change".

Paracelsus, who was called the "Luther of Medicine",<ref>Debus, Allen G. (1993). Paracelsus and the Medical Revolution of the Renaissance – A 500th Anniversary Celebration.  National Library of Medicine.  p. 3.</ref> describes these mystics sages as "persons who have been exalted (verzueckt) to God, and who have remained in that state of exaltation, and have not died (...) nobody knew what became of them, and yet they remained on the earth". Some modern Rosicrucian groups suggest that the Rosicrucian Order has been active since the beginning of the Renaissance period, not only as an hermetic Order, but also through forerunners – geniuses of the western world, sometimes also known to be Freemasons – in the literary,Hall, Manly Palmer (1928). The Secret Teachings of All Ages: Bacon, Shakespeare, and the Rosicrucians, pp. 165–168. cultural, ethical, political, religious and scientific fields.

In the late 18th century, Karl von Eckartshausen, a German Christian mystic, described the true Adepts of the Rose Cross in the following terms: "These sages, whose number is small, are children of light, and are opposed to darkness. They dislike mystification and secrecy; they are open and frank, have nothing to do with secret societies and with external ceremonies. They possess a spiritual temple, in which God is presiding". Later, in the early 20th century, Max Heindel, a Rosicrucian Initiate, believed that the roots of the Brothers of the Rose Cross, immersed in the western mystery tradition, are almost impossible to be traced as "theirs is a work which aims to encourage the evolution of humanity, they have labored far back into antiquity—under one guise or another".

Initiatory Groups

The Orden des Gold- und Rosenkreutz, also known as the Fraternity of the Golden and Rosy Cross, was founded in the 1750s and is believed to be the first Rosicrucian order which existed outside of allegory. Their ten-grade system went on to influence Masonic and Hermetic initatory groups.

Freemasonry

Connections between Freemasonry and Rose Cross exist from times preceding the formation of actual Grand Lodge (Landmarks of Andersen in 1717), as it is proved by the poem Threnodie of Henry Adamson (1638) "We are brethren of the Rosie Crossie, We have the Mason Word and second sight" The Rosy Cross is also a symbol found in some Masonic Christian bodies and employed by individuals and groups formed during the last centuries for the study of Rosicrucianism and allied subjects, but derived from the adoption of a red rose.

The Masonic Societas Rosicruciana in Anglia was founded in England in 1865 and uses the same grade system as the Gold und Rosenkreutz. The English group has since inspired other Masonic and initiatory Societas Rosicruciana organizations internationally.

Within the Southern Jurisdiction of the Scottish Rite concordant body of Freemasonry, the Eighteenth Degree is specifically concerned with the rose cross and confers the title of "Knight Rose Croix". Of one version of the degree, Albert Pike wrote in 1871,

Thomas De Quincey in his work titled; Rosicrucians and Freemasonry, suggested that Freemasonry was possibly an outgrowth of Rosicrucianism.

Golden Dawn

The Hermetic Order of the Golden Dawn was founded by three members of the SRIA, and made use of the rosy cross as well, including 'The Ritual of the Rose Cross," designed for spiritual protection and as preparation for meditation. Based on the Rosicrucian symbolism of the Red Rose and the Cross of Gold, it is also a key symbol of the Golden Dawn's Second Order. According to Israel Regardie, the Golden Dawn rosy cross contains attributes for the Elements, Planets, Zodiac, Hebrew alphabet, alchemical principles, the hexagram and pentagram, the Sefirot of the Tree of Life, and the formula of INRI. On the back side of the rosy cross is inscribed the motto of the Zelator Adeptus Minor at the bottom, "The master Jesus Christ, God and Man" between four Maltese crosses, and in the center, written in Latin, "Blessed be the Lord our God who hath given us the Symbol Signum."

Regardie says of the rosy cross in The Golden Dawn:

Symbolism of the Golden Dawn Rosy Cross
This lamen is a complete synthesis of the masculine, positive, or rainbow scale of color attributions, which is also called the Scale of the King. The four arms of the cross belong to the four elements and are colored accordingly. The white portion belongs to the Holy Spirit and the planets.

The petals of the rose refer to the twenty-two paths on the Tree of Life and the Twenty-two letters of the Hebrew alphabet. It is the cross in Tiphareth, the receptacle and the center of the forces of the Sephiroth and the paths. The extreme center of the rose is white, the reflected spiritual brightness of Kether, bearing upon it the Red Rose of Five Petals and the Golden Cross of Six Squares; four green rays issue from around the angles of the cross. Upon the white portion of the lamen, below the rose, is placed the hexagram, with the planets.

Around the pentagrams, which are placed one upon each elemental colored arm, are drawn the symbols of the spirit and the four elements. Upon each of the floriated  (the arms) of the cross are arranged the three alchemical principles of sulfur, salt, and mercury. The white rays issuing from behind the rose at the inner angles between the arms of the cross are the rays of the divine light issuing and coruscating from the reflected light of Kether in its center; and the letters and symbols on them refer to the analysis of the Key Word – I.N.R.I.

Thelema

The symbol of the rosy cross played a substantial role within the system of Thelema as developed by Aleister Crowley. In a cosmological context, the rose is Nuit, the infinitely expanded goddess of the night sky, and the cross is Hadit, the ultimately contracted atomic point. For Crowley, it was the job of the adept to identify with the appropriate symbol so to experience the mystical conjunction of opposites, which leads to attainment. In this sense, the rose cross is a grand symbol of the Great Work:

Crowley also believes that this process is reflected in the sexual act:

The rosy cross is further symbolic of the grade of Adeptus Minor in the A∴A∴, the Qabalistic sphere of Tiphareth on the Tree of Life, the magical formula INRI, and the concepts of Light (LVX) and Life.

Ordo Templi Orientis

The rose cross also has a place in the system of Ordo Templi Orientis. It is associated with the Fifth Degree, the title of which is "Sovereign Prince Rose-Croix, and Knight of the Pelican and Eagle." Of it, Crowley writes in "An Intimation with Reference to the Constitution of the Order":

Fellowship of the Rosy Cross

The Fellowship of the Rosy Cross is a Christian mystical organization established by Arthur Edward Waite in England in 1915. It developed after the end of Independent and Rectified Rite of the Golden Dawn. Waite made its rites to reflect his interest in the history of the Rosicrucian Order, Freemasonry, and Christian mystical teachings through the ages. Most of its members were Freemasons or theosophists. One of its most noted members was the novelist Charles Williams who was a member from 1917 to at least 1928 and possibly later. There were plans to establish a branch in the United States but they appear never to have been fulfilled. The order is still extant in England today.Gilbert, Robert A. (1983). The Golden Dawn: Twilight of the Magicians. Aquarian Press. pp. 76–77. . Arthur Edward Waite wrote also a book entitled The Brotherhood of the Rosy Cross, which presents the brotherhood as a Christian order dating from the Middle Ages.

Modern forms

One modern form of the Rosie Cross'' is found in a Rosicrucian Christian symbol that places a crown of red roses ennobling a white rose at the centre of the cross; radiating behind is the golden five-pointed star, an allusion also to 'the Five Points of Fellowship'. It is the symbol of the fraternity that has prepared a great lodge for the Brethren to be gathered.

The Ancient and Mystical Order Rosae Crucis, commonly known as AMORC, is the largest Rosicrucian group today, with twenty-three Grand Lodges or Jurisdictions worldwide. There are two primary versions used by AMORC. One is a Gold Latin Cross with a Rose at its center. Another is a downward pointing triangle with a Greek (equilateral) Cross inscribed within the triangle and a top oval reminiscent of an Egyptian Ankh. In both cases the symbolism suggests that "together, the rose and cross represent the experiences and challenges of a thoughtful life well-lived." In addition, the Gold Latin Cross version represents the human person with arms outstretched in worship, with the rose at its center as the unfoldment of the human soul over many lifetimes of work.

See also

References

External links

Ceremonial magic
Cross symbols
Magic symbols
Masonic symbolism
Rosicrucianism
Thelema